The Burmish languages are Burmese, including Standard Burmese, Arakanese and other Burmese dialects such as the Tavoyan dialects as well as non-literary languages spoken across Myanmar and South China such as Achang, Lhao Vo, Lashi, and Zaiwa.

The various Burmish languages have a total of 35 million native speakers.

Names
Many Burmish names are known by various names in different languages (Bradley 1997).

In China, the Zaiwa ဇိုင်ဝါး/အဇီး 载瓦 (local Chinese exonym: Xiaoshan ရှောင့်ရှန် 小山), Lhao Vo 浪速 (local Chinese exonym: Lang'e 浪峨), Lashi 勒期 (local Chinese exonym: Chashan 茶山), and Pela 波拉 are officially classified as Jingpo people (Bolayu Yanjiu). The local Chinese exonym for the Jingpho proper is Dashan 大山.

Dai Qingxia (2005:3) lists the following autonyms and exonyms for the various Burmish groups as well as for Jingpho which is not a Burmish language, with both Chinese character and IPA transcriptions (given in square brackets).

Autonyms are:
Lhao Vo လန့်စု 浪速 (Lang'e 浪峨): lɔ̃˥˩ vɔ˧˩
Jingpho ဂျိန်းဖော 景颇: tʃiŋ˧˩ pʰoʔ˧˩
Zaiwa အဇီး 载瓦: tsai˧˩ va˥˩
Lashi လချိတ် 勒期: lă˧˩ tʃʰi˥˩
Pela ပေါ်လာ 波拉: po˧˩ la˧˩

The Chashan refer to themselves as ŋɔ˧˩ tʃʰaŋ˥ (Echang 峨昌), the Jingpho as phuk˥, the Lashi as tsai˧wu˧˩ (tsai˧ wu˥ [商务印书馆].)

Languages

Lama (2012)
Based on innovations in their tonal systems, Lama (2012: 177–179) classifies the languages as follows:

Burmish
Burmese cluster (Southern Burmish)
Achang–Zaiwa (Northern Burmish)
Achang cluster
Achang
Zaiwa cluster
Pela (Bola)
Leqi–Zaiwa
Lashi (Leqi)
Langsu (Maru), Zaiwa (Atsi)

Chashan, a recently discovered Northern Burmish language, is closely related to Lashi.

Maingtha is a Northern Burmish language whose speakers are classified as a Shan subgroup.

Nishi (1999)
Based on distinct treatment of the pre-glottalized initials of proto-Burmish, Nishi (1999: 68-70) divides the Burmish languages into two branches, Burmic and Maruic. The Burmic languages changed voiceless preglottalized stops into voiceless aspirate stops and preglottalized voiced sonorants into voiceless sonorants. The Maruic languages in contrast reflect voiceless preglottalized and affricate consonants as voiceless unaspirated and affricates with laryngealized vowels, and voiced preglottalized sonorants as voiced sonorants with laryngealized vowels. The Burmic languages include Burmese, Achang, and Xiandao. The Maruic languages include Atsi (Zaiwa), Lashi (Leqi), Maru (Langsu), and Bola. Nishi does not classify Hpon and Nusu.

Burmic
The Arakanese language retains r- separate from y-, whereas the two fall together in most Burmese dialects and indeed most Burmish languages. Tavoyan has kept kl- distinct. No dialect has kept ry- distinct from r-, but this may be an independent innovation in the various dialects. Merguiese is apparently the least well studied Burmese dialect.

Burmese language (incl. Standard Burmese and Arakanese)
Achang (Huang et al. 1992, Wannemacher 1995-7)
Xiandao (Huang et al. 1992)
?Hpon/Hpun (Luce 1985: Charts S, T, V; Henderson 1986)
Danu

Maruic
Atsi (Zaiwa) (Burling 1967, Dai 1981, Yabu 1982, Xu and Xu 1984, Luce 1985: Charts S, T, V; Dai 1986, Huang et al. 1992, Wannemacher 1995-7, Wannemacher 1998)
Bola (Dai et al.: 1991; Huang et al. 1992, Edmondson 1992)
Lashi (Luce 1985: Charts S, T, V; Huang et al. 1992; Wannemacher 1995-7)
Maru (Lhao Vo) (Clerk 1911, Burling 1967, Luce 1985: Charts S, T, V; Okell 1988; Dai et al.: 1991; Huang et al. 1992; Wannemacher 1995-7)
Chashan also goes here

Mann (1998)
Mann (1998: 16, 137) in contrast groups together Achang, Bela (by which he probably means Bola), Lashi, Maru, and Atsi together as North Burmic.

Bradley (1997)
David Bradley places aberrant Ugong with Burmish rather than with Loloish:

Ugong–Burmish
Ugong
Burmish
Burmese
Burmish
Hpun
Core Burmish
Maru, Atsi
Lashi, Achang; Bola; Chintau (= Xiandao)

Footnotes

References
Bernot, D. (1958). "rapports phonetiques entre le dialecte marma et le birman." Bulletin de la Société de Linguistique de Paris 53: 273-294.
Bernot, D. (1965). "The vowel systems of Arakanese and Tavoyan." Lingua 15: 463-474.
Burling, Robbins (1967). Proto Lolo–Burmese. Bloomington: Indiana University.
Clerk, F. V. (1911). A manual of the Lawngwaw or Măru language, containing: the grammatical principles of the language, glossaries of special terms, colloquial exercises, and Maru-English and English-Maru vocabularies. Rangoon: American Baptist mission press.
Dai, Qing-xia (1981). "Zai-wa-yu shi-dong fan-chou di xing-tai bian-hua" (Morphological changes in the Zaiwa causative-verb category), in Min-zu yu-wen 1981.4:36-41.
Dai, Qing-xia (1986). Zaiwa-yu (the Atsi language). 中國大百科全書: 民族 Zhong-guo da-bai-ke quan-shu: Min-zu. (Magna Encyclopedia Sinica: Ethnology Volume).  Beijing : 中國大百科全書出版社 : 新華書店經銷 Zhongguo da bai ke quan shu chu ban she : Xin hua shu dian jing xiao
Edmondson, Jerold A. (1992) Trip Notebook and Tapes on Bela Language. Unpublished, cited by Mann 1998.
Henderson, Eugénie J. A. (1986). "Some hitherto unpublished material on Northern (Megyaw) Hpun." John McCoy and Timothy Light, eds. Contributions to Sino-Tibetan Studies: 101-134.
Xun Gong, & Nathan Hill. (2020, June 9). Materials for an Etymological Dictionary of Burmish. Zenodo. http://doi.org/10.5281/zenodo.4311182
Hill, Nathan, & Cooper, Douglas. (2020). A machine readable collection of lexical data on the Burmish languages [Data set]. Zenodo. http://doi.org/10.5281/zenodo.3759030
Huang Bufan 黃布凡, ed. (1992). 藏緬語族語言詞匯  Zangmianyuzu yuyan cihui  / A Tibeto-Burman Lexicon.  Beijing: 中央民族大學出版社 Zhongyang minzu daxue chubanshe, 1992.
Luce, G. H. (1985). Phases of Pre-Pagán Burma: Languages and History. Oxford: Oxford University Press.
Mann, Noel Walter. 1998. A phonological reconstruction of Proto Northern Burmic. Unpublished thesis. Arlington: The University of Texas.
Maran, L. R. (1971a). "A note on the development of tonal systems in Tibeto-Burman." Occasional Publications of the Wolfenden Society on Tibeto-Burman Linguistics 2.
Maran, L. R. (1971b). "Burmese and Jingpho: a study of tonal linguistic processes." Occasional Publications of the Wolfenden Society on Tibeto-Burman Linguistics 4.
Müller, André (2016). Linguistic convergence within the 'Kachin' languages. The Newsletter: International Institute for Asian Studies, (75):34-35. 
Pe Maung Tin (1933). "The dialect of Tavoy." Journal of the Burma Research Society 23.1: 31-46.
Okell, John (1988). "Notes on Tone Alternation in Maru Verbs". David Bradley, et al. eds. Prosodic Analysis and Asian Linguistics: to honour R.K. Sprigg. (Pacific Linguistics C-104). Canberra, A.C.T., Australia: Dept. of Linguistics, Research School of Pacific Studies, Australian National University:109-114.
Okell, John (1989). "Yaw: a dialect of Burmese". South East Asian linguistics: essays in honour of Eugénie J A Henderson. Ed. J H C S Davidson. London, SOAS:199-219.
Sawada Hideo (1999). "Outline of Phonology of Lhaovo (Maru) of Kachin State/". Linguistic & Anthropological Study of the Shan Culture Area, report of research project, Grant-in-Aid for International Scientific Research (Field Research):97-147.
Sprigg, R. K. (1963). "A comparison of Arakanese and Burmese based on phonological formulae." Shorto, H.L. (ed.) Linguistic Comparison in South East Asia and the Pacific: 109-132.
Taylor, L. F. (1922). "The dialects of Burmese." Journal of the Burma Research Society 11: 89-97.
Wannemacher, Mark W. (1995-7). Notes on Achang, Atsi, Jinghpaw, Lashi, and Maru. (unpublished manuscript cited by Mann 1998).
Wannemacher, Mark W. (1998) Aspects of Zaiwa Prosody: an Autosegmental Account. Summer Institute of Linguistics/University of Texas at Arlington.
Xu Xijian 徐悉艱 and Xu Guizhen 徐桂珍 (1984). 景頗族語言簡誌(載瓦語) / Jingpozu yuyan jianzhi (Zaiwa yu). Beijing: 民族出版社Minzu chubanshe,  1984.
Yabu Shirō 藪 司郎 (1980). "ビルマ語ヨー方言の資料 Birumago Yō hōgen no shiryō / Linguistic Data of the Yaw Dialect of the Burmese Language." アジア・アフリカ言語文化研究 Ajia Afurika gengo bunka kenkyū / Journal of Asian and African Studies 19: 164-182.
Yabu Shirō 藪 司郎 (1981a). "ビルマ語タウンヨウ方言の資料 Birumago Taunyou hōgen no shiryō / Linguistic Data of the Taung'yo Dialect of the Burmese Language." アジア・アフリカ言語文化研究 Ajia Afurika gengo bunka kenkyū / Journal of Asian and African Studies 21: 154-187.
Yabu Shirō 藪 司郎 (1981b). "ビルマ語ダヌ方言の会話テキスト Birumago Danu hōgen no kaiwa tekisuto  / Conversational Texts of the Danu Dialect of Burmese." アジア・アフリカ言語文化研究 Ajia Afurika gengo bunka kenkyū / Journal of Asian and African Studies 22: 124-138.
Yabu Shirō 藪 司郎 (1982). アツィ語基礎語彙集 / Atsigo kiso goishū / Classified dictionary of the Atsi or Zaiwa language (Sadon dialect) with Atsi, Japanese and English indexes. Tokyo: 東京外国語大学アジア・アフリカ言語文化研究所 Tōkyō Gaikokugo Daigaku Ajia Afurika Gengo Bunka Kenkyūjo.
Yabu Shirō 藪 司郎 (1988). A preliminary report on the study of the Maru, Lashi and Atsi languages of Burma. In Yoshiaki Ishizawa (ed.), Historical and cultural studies in Burma, 65-132. Tokyo: Institute of Asian Studies, Sophia University.

 
Languages of Myanmar
Lolo-Burmese languages